O'Bannon Woods State Park is a  state park in the state of Indiana, 32 miles (51 km) west of Louisville, Kentucky.

O'Bannon Woods was originally known as the Wyandotte Woods State Recreation Area, which was part of the Harrison-Crawford State Forest.  Its main attraction is Wyandotte Caves, which contain over nine miles of caverns and one of the world's largest underground "mountains". The Blue River runs through the park. Indiana DNR lists it as one of their "Seven Hidden Jewels".

The park was named for former governor Frank O'Bannon and houses the O'Bannon Woods Interpretive Center, which offers exhibits and nature programs year-round. The park receives about 120,000 visitors annually.

References 

Protected areas established in 2004
Protected areas of Harrison County, Indiana
State parks of Indiana
Nature centers in Indiana
2004 establishments in Indiana